Muhammad Aziz Al-Arfaj is a Saudi writer, poet and journalist.

Bioghraphy 
He was born in 15 October 1980 in the city of Riyadh and raised there after his father moved for a long period of time from Khab Al-Muraydisiyah, one of the villages adjacent to the city of Buraidah in Al-Qassim region, north of Najd, and his marriage to his mother, who belongs to the Banu Al-Asmar tribe in Asir, southern Saudi Arabia.

His father, who came from a rural family interested in agriculture, was an inspector and advisor in the Saudi Ministry of Interior after completing his university education at the College of Sharia in Riyadh. He was a popular poet, oral tale narrator, memorizer of lengthy Arabic anecdotes, and a lover of history, while his mother, who was also from a mountainous environment, was concerned with in agriculture as well, an abyss of collecting intangible heritage, and saying folk poetry.

The writer Muhammad Arfaj is a researcher in Nabati poetry, al-Humayni poetry, al-Hourani poetry, folklore, and popular poetry in the Arab world. He writes in Al-Riyadh newspaper in particular and in many Arab and international newspapers and has published many books, novels and books. The most prominent of them is the novel "The Top Floor" and the book "Popular Heritage In The Arab Narrative".

In 2003, he moved from the city of Riyadh to the city of Aden in Yemen to work for several years in the diplomatic corps, and his name was closely associated with the Yemeni cultural scene through his work for years during which he was able to approach Yemeni heritage and literature, and this crystallized in the form of dozens of studies that he wrote On Yemeni literature and the Humayni poetry in particular, and a novel titled "The Top Floor" was published for him, which was printed in Beirut, its events take place in the Yemeni environment.

In Yemen, he made contributions to the Hamini Nabatean relations between the Humayni and Nabati poetry and he is also the first to discover the original homeland of Bani Hilal, the owners of the Hilali biography.

Then he submitted his resignation from working in the Saudi diplomatic corps and returned to Riyadh to be a member of the Literary Club in Riyadh. He resided in the city of Chicago in the United States of America, and established the Spiritual Cultural Forum there before returning again to Riyadh and settling there.

His books

Poetry

Short story

Novel

Children's literature and arts

Women's culture and arts

Literature letters

Literary and intellectual studies

Co-author

See also 

 Tahir Zamakhshari
 Abdullah bin Khamis
 Muhammad ibn Ahmad al-Aqili

References 

Saudi Arabian novelists
Arabic literature
Arab writers
1979 births
Living people